Vaikkadu, is an industrial area in Manali, North of Chennai, a metropolitan city in Tamil Nadu, India. Vaikkadu is known for Manali Roundana, place where Tiruvottiyur-Ponneri high road intersects with originating Jawaharlal Nehru Road (Inner Ring Road) and Manali High road. Madras Fertilizer Limited and Toshiba JSW Power Systems Pvt. Ltd are notable companies located within Vaikkadu in Manali Industrial belt. In October 2011, the erstwhile Manali municipality is merged with Greater Chennai Corporation and it came under the jurisdiction of Greater Chennai Corporation. Though Vaikkadu is annexed with Greater Chennai Corporation it is still remained as a part of Tiruvottiyur taluk in Tiruvallur district.

Location
Vaikkadu is located in Manali, North Chennai with  Tiruvottiyur in the east and south. Other neighbouring areas include Mathur, Madhavaram, Andarkuppam, Manali New Town, Kosappur, Ennore.

Surroundings

References

External links
Corporation of Chennai
CMDA Official Webpage
CDMA map of Mathur

Neighbourhoods in Chennai